Jens Joel Sand (born 12 May 1978 in Odense) is a Danish politician, who is a member of the Folketing for the Social Democrats political party. He was elected into parliament at the 2011 Danish general election.

Political career
Joel was first elected into parliament in the 2011 election. He was reelected in 2015 and 2019.

External links 
 Biography on the website of the Danish Parliament (Folketinget)

References 

1978 births
Living people
People from Odense
Social Democrats (Denmark) politicians
Members of the Folketing 2011–2015
Members of the Folketing 2015–2019
Members of the Folketing 2019–2022
Members of the Folketing 2022–2026